This is a list of listed buildings in the parish of Rutherglen in South Lanarkshire, Scotland.

List 

|}

Key

Notes

References
 All entries, addresses and coordinates are based on data from Historic Scotland. This data falls under the Open Government Licence

External links
Listed Buildings in Rutherglen Central and North Ward, South Lanarkshire at British Listed Buildings
Listed Buildings in Rutherglen South Ward, South Lanarkshire at British Listed Buildings

Rutherglen
 List R
Rutherglen